
Year 471 BC was a year of the pre-Julian Roman calendar. At the time, it was known as the Year of the Consulship of Sabinus and Barbatus (or, less frequently, year 283 Ab urbe condita). The denomination 471 BC for this year has been used since the early medieval period, when the Anno Domini calendar era became the prevalent method in Europe for naming years.

Events 
 By place 
 Greece 
 Athenian politician Themistocles loses the confidence of the Athenian people, partly due to his arrogance and partly due to his alleged readiness to take bribes. As a result, he is ostracized and retires to Argos.
 The colony of Pixunte (Pixous) is founded in Magna Graecia.

Births 
 Thucydides, Greek historian (alleged date, however, 460 BC is more probable) (d. c. 395 BC)

Deaths

References